James Nelson Williams (22 August 1837 – 11 June 1915) was a notable New Zealand runholder, orchardist and entrepreneur. He was born in Waimate North, Northland, New Zealand in 1837.

References

1837 births
1915 deaths
New Zealand farmers
New Zealand horticulturists
People from the Bay of Islands
New Zealand orchardists